Karlaplan metro station is a station on the red line of the Stockholm metro, located at Karlaplan in the district of Östermalm. The station was opened on 2 September 1967 as part of the extension from Östermalmstorg to Ropsten.

References

External links
Images of Karlaplan

Red line (Stockholm metro) stations
Railway stations opened in 1967